Toon Aerts (born 19 October 1993 in Malle) is a Belgian professional cyclo-cross and road cyclist, who currently rides for UCI Continental team . Aerts is a two-time winner of the UCI Cyclo-cross World Cup standings (2018–19, 2019–20), and also won the men's elite race at the 2016 European Championships and the 2019 Belgian National Championships.

Major results

Road
2017
 1st Internationale Wielertrofee Jong Maar Moedig
 6th Overall Ster ZLM Toer
2019
 1st  Mountains classification, Tour de Wallonie
 2nd Overall Flèche du Sud
1st  Mountains classification
 4th Overall Tour of Belgium
2020
 9th Dwars door het Hageland
2021 
 9th Overall Tour of Belgium

Cyclo-cross

2010–2011
 3rd Junior Hasselt
2012–2013
 Under-23 Superprestige
3rd Hoogstraten
2013–2014
 2nd National Under-23 Championships
 Under-23 Superprestige
2nd Zonhoven
2nd Hoogstraten
3rd Middelkerke
2014–2015
 2nd National Under-23 Championships
 Under-23 Bpost Bank Trophy
2nd Baal
2nd Lille
3rd Ronse
3rd Koppenberg
3rd Loenhout
 Under-23 Superprestige
3rd Spa-Francorchamps
2015–2016
 Soudal Classics
1st Leuven
 1st Bensheim
 2nd Eeklo
 Bpost Bank Trophy
3rd Baal
2016–2017
 1st  UEC European Championships
 DVV Trophy
1st Baal
 Soudal Classics
1st Niel
3rd Sint-Niklaas
 2nd Ardooie
 2nd Otegem
 Superprestige
3rd Gavere
3rd Spa-Francorchamps
 3rd Waterloo
2017–2018
 Soudal Classics
1st Niel
2nd Hasselt
2nd Sint-Niklaas
 3rd Overall UCI World Cup
2nd Namur
3rd Bogense
3rd Zeven
3rd Nommay
 2nd Overall DVV Trophy
2nd Koppenberg
3rd Essen
3rd Loenhout
 Superprestige
2nd Gavere
 2nd Brabant
 2nd Ardooie
 3rd  UEC European Championships
 3rd Otegem
 3rd Waterloo
2018–2019
 1st  National Championships
 1st  Overall UCI World Cup
1st Waterloo
1st Iowa City
2nd Pontchâteau
2nd Hoogerheide
3rd Bern
3rd Koksijde
3rd Namur
 2nd Overall DVV Trophy
1st Koppenberg
2nd Niel
2nd Baal
2nd Brussels
3rd Antwerpen
3rd Loenhout
3rd Lille
 Soudal Classics
1st Leuven
 1st Overijse
 2nd Overall Superprestige
2nd Boom
2nd Gavere
2nd Hoogstraten
3rd Gieten
3rd Ruddervoorde
3rd Zonhoven
3rd Diegem
3rd Middelkerke
 2nd Oostmalle
 3rd  UCI World Championships
 Brico Cross
3rd Lokeren
3rd Maldegem
 3rd Otegem
 3rd Ardooie
2019–2020
 1st  Overall UCI World Cup
2nd Iowa City
2nd Waterloo
2nd Bern
2nd Namur
2nd Nommay
2nd Hoogerheide
3rd Koksijde
 Superprestige
1st Boom
1st Zonhoven
2nd Middelkerke
3rd Ruddervoorde
 DVV Trophy
1st Ronse
3rd Kortrijk
3rd Lille
 Rectavit Series
1st Leuven
 Ethias Cross
2nd Kruibeke
2nd Beringen
3rd Meulebeke
3rd Maldegem
3rd Hulst
 2nd Oostmalle
 3rd  UCI World Championships
 3rd National Championships
2020–2021
 1st Overall Superprestige
1st Gieten
2nd Ruddervoorde
3rd Niel
3rd Boom
 2nd Overall X²O Badkamers Trophy
1st Brussels
3rd Koppenberg
 Ethias Cross
1st Kruibeke
1st Beringen
2nd Lokeren
2nd Bredene
2nd Eeklo
2nd Sint-Niklaas
 2nd National Championships
 3rd  UCI World Championships
 UCI World Cup
3rd Dendermonde
2021–2022
 1st Overall X²O Badkamers Trophy
1st Kortrijk
1st Lille
2nd Koppenberg
2nd Hamme
3rd Loenhout
3rd Herentals
 2nd Overall Superprestige
1st Gieten
2nd Niel
2nd Boom
3rd Ruddervoorde
3rd Gavere
 3rd Overall UCI World Cup
1st Zonhoven
2nd Besançon
2nd Flamanville
3rd Overijse
3rd Koksijde
3rd Namur
3rd Dendermonde
 Ethias Cross
3rd Meulebeke

References

External links
 
 

1993 births
Living people
Belgian male cyclists
Cyclo-cross cyclists
Belgian cyclo-cross champions
Cyclists from Antwerp Province
People from Malle